Oțelul have appointed Aurel Ţicleanu as their new manager, after the contract of Dumitru Dumitriu has expired. A few months later, in November, he resigned from the team. The team was left in charge of assistant-manager Ion Gigi until the winter-break. The new manager of the team, Ilie Dumitrescu, was announced on December 6, 2000. His contract ended after the last match of the season, in June 2001.

Competitions

Friendlies

Divizia A

League table

Results by round

Results summary

Matches

Cupa României

Players

Transfers

In

Out

See also

 2000–01 Divizia A
 2000–01 Cupa României

References

ASC Oțelul Galați seasons
Oțelul, Galați, ACS